Robert Chambers (1834–1886) was a Canadian politician, serving as Mayor of Quebec City from May 1878 to May 1880.

References

1834 births
1886 deaths
Mayors of Quebec City